Gangdong-myeon may refer to:

Gangdong-myeon, Gyeongju
Gangdong-myeon, Gangneung